Club Deportivo Litoral, commonly known as Club Litoral or as just Litoral, is a Bolivian football club based in La Paz. The team plays in La Paz Football Association, the regionalised third division of Bolivian football league system.

The only participation of Litoral in international football came in 1948 when the squad competed in the South American Championship of Champions, the first wide–continental tournament of South American football.

History
A group of workers of Soligno factory in La Paz founded the club on March 23, 1932, but the Chaco War postponed club's activities until 1936, when Litoral returned to competitions, playing friendly matches at Estadio Hernando Siles under the name "Deportivo Saboya", which was then changed to "Club Deportivo Calama". 

In 1938 the name was changed to "Club Deportivo y Cultural Litoral" commemorating the region tamed by Chile during the War of the Pacific. As most of the club's founders were Italian, the colors adopted for the squad jersey were red, white and green.

In 1948, Litoral was one of the seven clubs that contested the first wide-continental competition in South America, the South American Championship of Champions won by Vasco da Gama. Litoral finished in the sixth place out of seven clubs, with forward Roberto Caparelli being the top scorer of the tournament.

Stadium
Club Litoral play their home games at Estadio Hernando Siles. The stadium has a maximum capacity of 42,000 people.

Honours
Primera División (1): 1954

References

External links
Club Litoral on Facebook 

Association football clubs established in 1932
Football clubs in Bolivia
La Paz
1932 establishments in Bolivia